Jira or Jeera is a Thai given name. Notable people with the name include:

 Jira Maligool (born 1961), Thai film director
 Jira Payne, American politician
 Jira Wichitsongkhram, former Thai Minister of Defence
 Jeera Jarernsuk, Thai footballer

Thai masculine given names